Analavory is a town and commune in Madagascar. It belongs to the district of Miarinarivo, which is a part of Itasy Region. The population of the commune was 62,130 in 2018.

Primary and junior level secondary education are available in town. It is also a site of industrial-scale  mining. The majority 85% of the population of the commune are farmers.  The most important crop is rice, while other important products are maize and tomato. Services provide employment for 15% of the population.

Some 12 km north-east from the town are located Analavory Geysers - four cold water geysers.

Roads
The national roads N1b, RN1b and RN43 make junction near or in the town of  Analavory.

Rivers
Analavory lies at the Mazy river.

Subfossil sites
Near Analavory lies the site of Ampasambazimba where several subfossils of lemurs were discovered in the beginning of the 20th century.

References

Populated places in Itasy Region